Ron Smith (born July 8, 1966) is an American director, voice actor and animator. He has been the voice of Kevin in 3-2-1 Penguins and worked as an assistant engineer on RoboCop: Alpha Commando and a character animator on G.I. Joe: Valor vs. Venom.

Currently working on the Angel Studios project, The Wingfeather Saga (based on the book series by Andrew Peterson).

Personal life
He resides in Los Angeles, California with his wife Juile Smith.

External links

1966 births
Living people
University of Illinois alumni
American television writers
American male television writers
American male voice actors
American animators
American animated film directors
American television directors
American film directors
American audio engineers
American voice directors
Male actors from Dayton, Ohio
Screenwriters from Ohio
Engineers from Ohio